Harold Edgar Clurman (September 18, 1901 – September 9, 1980) was an American theatre director and drama critic. In 2003, he was named one of the most influential figures in U.S. theater by PBS. He was one of the three founders of New York City's Group Theatre (1931–1941). He directed more than 40 plays in his career and, during the 1950s, was nominated for a Tony Award as director for several productions. In addition to his directing career, he was drama critic for The New Republic (1948–1952) and The Nation (1953–1980), helping shape American theater by writing about it. Clurman wrote seven books about the theatre, including his memoir The Fervent Years: The Group Theatre and the Thirties (1961).

Early life and education
Clurman was born on the Lower East Side of New York City, the son of Jewish parents from Kamenets Podolsky, Russia now Ukraine, in Eastern Europe, Samuel, a doctor, and Bertha Clurman. He had three older brothers, Morris, Albert, and William. His parents took him at age six to Yiddish theater, and Jacob Adler's performances in Yiddish translations of Karl Gutzkow's Uriel Acosta and Gotthold Ephraim Lessing's Nathan the Wise fascinated him, although he did not understand Yiddish.

He attended Columbia and, at the age of 20, moved to France to study at the University of Paris. There he shared an apartment with the young composer Aaron Copland. In Paris, he saw all sorts of theatrical productions. He was influenced especially by the work of Jacques Copeau and the Moscow Art Theatre, whose permanent company built a strong creative force. He wrote his thesis on the history of French drama from 1890 to 1914.

Clurman returned to New York in 1924 and started working as an extra in plays, despite his lack of experience. He became a stage manager and play reader for the Theatre Guild. He briefly studied Stanislavski's system under the tutelage of Richard Boleslavsky, and became Jacques Copeau's translator/assistant on his production of The Brothers Karamazov, based on the novel by the Russian writer Fyodor Dostoevsky.

Career
Clurman began work as an actor in New York. He felt that the standard American theater, though successful at the box office, was not culturally significant. He said, "I was interested in what the theater was going to say [...]. The theater must say something. It must relate to society. It must relate to the world we live in."

Together with the like-minded Cheryl Crawford and Lee Strasberg, he began to create what would become the Group Theatre. In November 1930, Clurman led weekly lectures, in which they talked about founding a permanent theatrical company to produce plays dealing with important modern social issues. Together with 28 other young people, they formed a group that developed a groundbreaking style of theater that strongly influenced American productions, including such elements as Stanislavski-trained actors, realism based on American stories, and political content. By building a permanent company, they expected to increase the synergy and trust among the members, who included Stella Adler, Morris Carnovsky, Phoebe Brand, Elia Kazan, Clifford Odets, and Sanford Meisner.

In the summer of 1931, the first members of the Group Theatre rehearsed for several weeks in the countryside of Nichols, Connecticut at the Pine Brook Country Club. They were preparing The House of Connelly by Paul Green, their first production, directed by Strasberg. Clurman was the scholar of the group — he knew multiple languages, read widely, and listened to a broad array of music. Strasberg dealt with acting and directing, and Crawford dealt with the business.

The first play which Clurman directed for the Group Theatre was Awake and Sing! by Clifford Odets in 1935. The play's success led Clurman to develop his directing style. He believed that all the elements of a play—text, acting, lighting, scenery and direction—needed to work together to convey a unified message. Clurman would read the script over and over, each time focusing on a different element or character. He tried to inspire, guide and constructively critique his designers rather than dictate to them. He also used Richard Boleslavsky's technique of identifying the "spine," or main action, of each character, then using those to determine the spine of the play. He encouraged his actors to find "active verbs" to describe what their characters were trying to accomplish.

In 1937, tensions among Clurman, Crawford and Strasberg caused the latter two to resign from the Group; four years later, the Group Theatre permanently disbanded. Clurman went on to direct plays on Broadway, more than 40 in all, and write as a newspaper theatre critic.

Marriage and family
In 1943 Clurman married Stella Adler, a charismatic theatre actress and later a renowned New York acting coach. A member of the Group Theatre since its founding, Adler was the daughter of the notable Yiddish actor Jacob Adler. Clurman was her second husband. They divorced in 1960. Clurman's second marriage was to the independent filmmaker Juleen Compton.

Director and drama critic
Clurman had an active career as a director, over the decades leading more than 40 productions, and helping bring many new works to the stage. He is considered "one of the most influential theater directors in America".

In addition, Clurman helped shape American theater by writing about it, as drama critic for The New Republic (1948–1952), The Nation (1953–1980), and New York (1968). He encouraged new styles of production, such as that of the Living Theater, and championed contemporary plays and playwrights.

Author
He wrote a memoir about the Group Theatre's beginning and their making art within American culture, called The Fervent Years: The Group Theatre and the Thirties. His six other books about the theater include On Directing (1972); his autobiography, All People are Famous (1974); The Divine Pastime (1974); Ibsen (1977); and Nine Plays of the Modern Theater (1981). Most of his essays and reviews can be found in The Collected Works of Harold Clurman.

On acting 
Uta Hagen in Respect for Acting credits Clurman with a new perspective on acting. She summarized his approach as demanding the human being within the character:

In 1947, I worked in a play under the direction of Harold Clurman. He opened a new world in the professional theatre for me. He took away my 'tricks.' He imposed no line readings, no gestures, no positions on the actors. At first I floundered badly because for many years I had become accustomed to using specific outer directions as the material from which to construct the mask for my character, the mask behind which I would hide throughout the performance. Mr. Clurman refused to accept a mask. He demanded ME in the role. My love of acting was slowly reawakened as I began to deal with a strange new technique of evolving in the character. I was not allowed to begin with, or concern myself at any time with, a preconceived form. I was assured that a form would result from the work we were doing.

Clurman died on September 9, 1980 in New York City of cancer. He is buried in Mt. Carmel Cemetery, Glendale, Queens.

Works on Broadway
Note: All works are plays and are the original productions unless otherwise noted.
Caesar and Cleopatra (1925) (revival) - actor
The Goat Song (1926) - actor
The Chief Thing (1926) - actor
Juarez and Maximilian (1926) - actor
Night Over Taos (1932) - produced by the Group Theater
Big Night (1933) - produced by the Group Theater
Men in White (1934) - produced by the Group Theater
Awake and Sing! (1935) - director, produced by the Group Theater
Waiting for Lefty (1935) - produced by the Group Theater
Till the Day I Die (1935) - produced by the Group Theater
Weep for the Virgins (1935) - produced by the Group Theater
Paradise Lost (1935) - director, produced by the Group Theater
Case of Clyde Griffiths (1936) - co-produced by the Group Theater
Johnny Johnson (1936) - produced by the Group Theater
Golden Boy (1937) - director, produced by the Group Theater
Casey Jones (1938) - produced by the Group Theater
Rocket to the Moon (1938) - director, produced by the Group Theater
The Gentle People (1939) - director, produced by the Group Theater
Awake and Sing! (1939) (revival) - director, produced by the Group Theater
My Heart's in the Highlands (1939) - produced by the Group Theater
Thunder Rock (1939) - produced by the Group Theater
Night Music (1940) - director, produced by the Group Theater
Retreat to Pleasure (1940) - director
The Russian People (1942) - director
Deadline at Dawn (1945) - movie, director
Beggars Are Coming to Town (1945) - director
Truckline Cafe (1946) - director and co-producer
All My Sons (1947) - co-producer
The Whole World Over (1947) - director
The Young and Fair (1948) - director
The Member of the Wedding (1950) - director
The Bird Cage (1950) - director
The Autumn Garden (1951) - director
Desire Under the Elms (1952) (revival) - director
The Time of the Cuckoo (1953) - director
The Emperor's Clothes (1953) - director
The Ladies of the Corridor (1953) - director
Mademoiselle Colombe (1954) - director
Bus Stop (1955) - director, Tony nomination for Best Director
Tiger at the Gates (1955) - director, Tony nomination for Best Director
Pipe Dream (1955) - director, Tony nomination for Best Director
The Waltz of the Toreadors (1957) - director, Tony nomination for Best Director
Orpheus Descending (1957) - director
The Day the Money Stopped (1958) - director
The Waltz of the Toreadors (1958) (revival) - director
A Touch of the Poet (1958) - director
The Cold Wind and the Warm (1958) - director
Heartbreak House (1959) (revival) - director
A Shot in the Dark (1961) - director
After the Fall, The Changeling, Incident at Vichy - director, and Tartuffe (all played in repertory) (1964–1965) - executive consultant to the producer, Repertory Theater of Lincoln Center
Where's Daddy? (1966) - director

Legacy and honors
Clurman's legacy is his contribution to the creation of a uniquely American theater. The Harold Clurman Theatre within the Theatre Row Building complex Off Broadway is named for him. Ronald Rand brought Harold Clurman to life in his acclaimed solo play, LET IT BE ART!, which has been performed for 22 years in 26 countries, 20 U.S. states, and at the Theatre Olympics in New Delhi and Kerala. Harold Clurman was awarded the Republic of France's Legion d'Honneur.

The Stella Adler and Harold Clurman Collection came to the Harry Ransom Center at the University of Texas at Austin in 2003. The collection includes original and reproduced materials gathered by Marjorie Loggia. Of particular interest are a handwritten draft of The Fervent Years, a photocopy typescript of "Plans for a First Studio," handwritten and typescript drafts of Lies Like Truth, and an edited typescript of Reminiscences: An Oral History. Among other noteworthy Clurman material are his correspondence (with Stella Adler and others), contracts and royalties, a diary, and theater programs he collected from 1926 to 1930.

Clurman is a character in Names, Mark Kemble's play about former Group Theatre members' struggles with the House Un-American Activities Committee.

Notes

References
 Harold Clurman on Spartacus Educational, retrieved February 26, 2005. 
 Adler, Jacob, A Life on the Stage: A Memoir, translated and with commentary by Lulla Rosenfeld, Knopf, New York, 1999, .

Carnicke, Sharon. Stanislavsky in Focus, Cornwall: TJ International Ltd, 2003.
Clurman, Harold. All People Are Famous (instead of an autobiography). New York: Harcourt Brace Jovanovich, Inc., 1974.
Clurman, Harold. The Fervent Years. USA: The Colonial Press Inc., 1961
Clurman, Harold. Ibsen. Hong Kong: Macmillan Press Ltd., 1978.
Clurman, Harold. On Directing, New York: Macmillan Publishing Co. Inc., 1974.
"Clurman, Harold." Encyclopædia Britannica. 2007. Encyclopædia Britannica Online. 2 October 2007
Smith, Wendy. Real Life Drama: The Group Theatre and America, 1931-1940, New York, Alfred A. Knopf, Inc., 1990.

External links
 Harold Clurman, American Masters, Public Broadcasting Service PBS
 Harold Clurman papers, 1938-1978, held by the Billy Rose Theatre Division, New York Public Library for the Performing Arts
 Harold Clurman Collection, Harry Ransom Center, University of Texas at Austin
 , Wall Street Journal
 

1901 births
1980 deaths
20th-century American Jews
American theater critics
American theatre directors
Columbia University alumni
Donaldson Award winners
University of Paris alumni
The Nation (U.S. magazine) people
The New Republic people
People from the Lower East Side
American expatriates in France